Greenville Commercial Historic District may refer to:

 Greenville Commercial Historic District (Greenville, Kentucky), listed on the NRHP in Muhlenberg County, Kentucky
 Greenville Commercial Historic District (Greenville, Mississippi), listed on the NRHP in Mississippi
 Greenville Commercial Historic District (Greenville, North Carolina), listed on the NRHP in Pitt County, North Carolina
 Greenville South Broadway Commercial District, Greenville, Ohio, listed on the NRHP in Darke County, Ohio
 Greenville Commercial Historic District (Greenville, Pennsylvania), listed on the NRHP in Mercer County, Pennsylvania